Reishahr or Rev Ardashir was a city on the Persian Gulf in medieval Iran and is currently an archaeological site near Bushehr. It may be identical to the Antiochia-in-Persis of the Seleucid period, but was refounded by Ardashir I (d. AD 224), the first ruler of the Sasanian Empire. In the Church of the East, it was seat of the metropolitan bishop of the province of Fars from at least 424. The name "Rew-Ardashir" means "Rich is Ardashir".

The city is mentioned by many historians, such as Farhang-i Anandraj, Hamdollah Mostowfi's Nuzhat al-Qulub, Majmal al-tawarikh, and Ibn Balkhi's Farsnameh. In particular, some historians such as Yaqut al-Hamawi's Mu'jam Al-Buldan write of the city being centered on a pre-Islamic academic center of higher learning where scholars converged to study medicine as well as Indian and Greek sciences.

Dehkhoda dictionary mentions that the city was eventually deserted and its inhabitants moved to Bushehr.

Notes

Bibliography
 
 

Former populated places in Fars Province
Sasanian cities
Ardashir I